South Nanango is a rural locality in the South Burnett Region, Queensland, Australia. In the  South Nanango had a population of 858 people.

Geography 
As the name suggests, South Nanango is a locality south of the town of Nanango. The land is between 400 and 450 metres above sea level. The lower land which is well-watered by many small creeks is used for agriculture, principally grazing cattle. The higher land in the east and south of the locality is the South Nanango State Forest. South Nanango is on a drainage divide running through the locality from the north-east to the south west, with the north-western part of the locality contributing to the Burnett River basin and the south-eastern part of the locality contributing to the Brisbane River basin.

The D'Aguilar Highway (which links Caboolture to Kingaroy) passes through the locality from south to north.

History 
Buckland State School opened on 25 October 1909. It closed in 1959. It was located at 27310 D'Aguilar Highway (on the south-western corner with Bucklands Road).

In the  South Nanango had a population of 858 people.

References

Further reading 

 

South Burnett Region
Localities in Queensland